KHQ-TV (channel 6) is a television station in Spokane, Washington, United States, affiliated with NBC. It is the flagship and namesake of the KHQ Television Group, a subsidiary of the locally based Cowles Company, which also owns The Spokesman-Review newspaper. KHQ-TV's studios are located on West Sprague Avenue in Downtown Spokane, and its transmitter is located on Krell Hill southeast of the city. The station also operates a 24-hour sports and weather channel called SWX Right Now on digital subchannel 6.2.

KHQ-TV is also carried on cable systems in Calgary and Edmonton, Alberta, Canada, both of which are double the size of the station's American coverage area. One result of this is that stations in Calgary and Edmonton air American shows on Pacific Time, even though Calgary and Edmonton are both on Mountain Time. KHQ-TV is one of five local Spokane area television stations seen in Canada on the Shaw Direct satellite service. It can also be seen on local cable systems in eastern British Columbia.

KHQ-TV also handles master control and some internal operations for sister stations and fellow NBC affiliates KNDO and KNDU in the Yakima–Tri-Cities market.

History
While KHQ and KXLY were both granted authorization by the Federal Communications Commission (FCC) to build television stations on July 12, 1952, KHQ was first to sign on the air, going live on Saturday, December 20, 1952 at 6 p.m. with the film Texas Trouble Shooters. The first NBC program KHQ broadcast was an episode of Your Hit Parade, which aired that evening at 7:30. In addition to being the oldest television station east of the Cascades, KHQ is also the second-oldest station in Washington state. It was co-owned by Cowles Publishing along with KHQ radio (AM 590, now KQNT; and FM 98.1, now KISC). The radio stations were both sold off in 1985.

It was originally a dual NBC/ABC affiliate. KREM-TV took the ABC affiliation when it signed on the air in 1954, but KHQ kept the NBC affiliation, which it retains to this day. It is the only major station in Spokane, and one of a few in the country, that has retained the same primary affiliation, owner, and call letters throughout its history.

After being in its original studio for over forty years, KHQ moved to a new all-digital facility at 1201 W. Sprague Avenue in Downtown Spokane in 2001.

Traditionally, KHQ has been colloquially known on-air as "Q6" since the 1960s, but the station switched to call letter branding from around 2005 to 2018, albeit retaining the "Q6" within its logo. On September 24, 2018, coinciding with the introduction of new newscast graphics, the "Q6" branding was restored full-time to the station's newscasts, which were rebranded "Q6 Local News – Right Now." In October 2022, KHQ's news programming was rebranded as NonStop Local, as part of a group-wide rebranding.

Programming 
KHQ-TV's current syndicated programming offerings include The Drew Barrymore Show, TMZ, Hot Bench, Judge Judy, Jeopardy! and Wheel of Fortune.

KHQ-TV has been the local home of Gonzaga Bulldogs men's basketball games since 2001. KHQ-TV and Root Sports Northwest simulcast all games not covered by either the West Coast Conference's television contract with ESPN or that of an inter-conference opponent.

News operation 

In 2006, with the popularity of high-definition newscasts increasing around the country, the race to HD began in the Spokane television market when competitor KXLY became the first Spokane station to produce a local segment of the news in HD. Each week, one news story was presented in high definition. Until 2008, KXLY was the only news station in Spokane to produce a segment of the news in HD.

On May 16, 2008, KHQ produced a live, on-the-air report in HD. It was officially announced on this date that KHQ was slated to become the first station in Spokane to broadcast its entire newscasts in HD, debuting on August 8, 2008 to coincide with the 2008 Summer Olympics on NBC.  However, after months of marketing this milestone, KXLY shocked KHQ and the Spokane television market when it made a surprise announcement on August 1, just two days before the start of its broadcasts, that it would beat KHQ in becoming the first station in Spokane to produce HD newscasts. KXLY's HD newscasts started August 3, just a mere five days before KHQ's scheduled date. Despite marketing their newscasts as being in HD, KHQ did not yet present its newscasts in true high definition, but standard definition widescreen. However, with the implementation of a new master control hub (which handles the operations of KHQ, along with sister stations KNDU and KNDO and its SWX channels) using fiberoptic links, and the purchase of new studio equipment and cameras, KHQ migrated to full HD newscasts in late 2012.

In 2008, KHQ and Northern Quest Resort & Casino started a partnership and created SWX, a 24-hour sports and weather channel. SWX soft-launched in January 2009, and officially launched on August 30, 2009.

Unlike most NBC affiliates, the station does not air a noon newscast.

Notable former on-air staff
 Peter Alexander (1997–2000; now NBC News White House Correspondent)
 Ana Cabrera (2005–2009; now CNN weekday anchor)
 Christine Clayburg (1998–2000; now executive producer for Clayburg Creative Group, professional actor for Screen Actors Guild, and loadmaster for Air National Guard)
 Penny Daniels (1998–2000; now strategic communications consultant at 3D Communications, a company she co-founded)
 Ira Joe Fisher (1970–1980; later substitute meteorologist and announcer for The Early Show on CBS)
 Phil Keating (1991–1993; now at Fox News Channel)
 Alex Rozier (2011–2014; formerly reporter at KING-TV in Seattle and WFAA in Dallas and currently reporter for KNBC in Los Angeles)

Technical information

Subchannels
The station's digital signal is multiplexed:

Analog-to-digital conversion
KHQ-TV discontinued regular programming on its analog signal, over VHF channel 6, on February 17, 2009, the original target date in which full-power television stations in the United States were to transition from analog to digital broadcasts under federal mandate (which was later pushed back to June 12, 2009). The station's digital signal remained on its pre-transition UHF channel 15 due to adjacent channel interference with KSPS (now on channel 8). Through the use of PSIP, digital television receivers display the station's virtual channel as its former VHF analog channel 6.

Translators

References

External links

SWX (KHQ DT 6-2) official website

Cowles Company
NBC network affiliates
Television channels and stations established in 1952
1952 establishments in Washington (state)
HQ-TV